Bapaume is an unincorporated community in Spiritwood Rural Municipality No. 496, Saskatchewan, Canada.

See also 
 List of communities in Saskatchewan

References 

Ghost towns in Saskatchewan
Spiritwood No. 496, Saskatchewan
Unincorporated communities in Saskatchewan
Division No. 16, Saskatchewan